Ivy without qualifiers usually means plants in the genus Hedera in the family Araliaceae.

Ivy may also refer to:

Plants
The plant growth form "vine" or "liana."
Boston ivy, Parthenocissus tricuspidatus, in the grape family Vitaceae
Ground ivy, one of the species of the mint genus Glechoma
Poison ivy, a plant in the genus Toxicodendron in the family Anacardiaceae
Swedish ivy, a plant species in the genus Plectranthus

Arts and entertainment

Characters
Ivy (Blame!), from the manga Blame!
Ivy Tilsley, from the British soap opera Coronation Street
Ivy Valentine, from the Soul series of fighting games

Films
Ivy (1947 film), an American film noir
Ivy (2015 film), a Turkish drama

Music
Ivy (band), an American pop band 1994–2012
Ivy (Elisa album), 2010
Ivy (Ivy Quainoo album), 2012
"Ivy" (Frank Ocean song), 2016
"Ivy" (Taylor Swift song), 2020
"Ivy", a song by Mabel from Ivy to Roses, 2017
"Ivy (Doomsday)", a song by Amity Affliction from Misery, 2018

Brands and enterprises
Ivy (motorcycles), a motorcycle manufacturer
The Ivy, a restaurant in London, England
The Ivy (Los Angeles), a restaurant
FG (restaurant), formerly Ivy, in Rotterdam, Netherlands

People
Ivy (name), a list of people with the given name or surname
Ivy (Chinese singer) or Ai Fei (Deng Wanxing, born 1987), singer, dancer and actress
Ivy (South Korean singer) (Park Eun-hye, born 1982), singer and musical actress

Places
Ivy, California, US, a former town
Ivy, Virginia, US
Ivy, West Virginia, US
Ivy, a community in the township of Essa, Ontario, Canada
IVY, the National Rail station code for Ivybridge railway station, Devon, England

Other uses
Apache Ivy, a transitive package manager
MV Ivy, a Panamanian coaster
Operation Ivy, two nuclear tests in 1952

See also
Ivy League, an association of prestigious American universities
"The Jesuit Ivy", a nickname for Boston College, Massachusetts
Ivy Mike, the code name given to the first test of a successful fusion device, detonated in 1952
Ivey (disambiguation)
Ivie (disambiguation)
Poison ivy (disambiguation)

pl:Iwa